Chen Changjie; is a retired professional badminton player from China.

Career 
Chen rated among the world's leading singles players when China entered the International Badminton Federation (now Badminton World Federation) in 1981. The powerful Changjie won the first major IBF sanctioned tournament in which China participated, the multi-sport 1981 World Games in Santa Clara, California, by successively beating Prakash Padukone and Morten Frost in the semifinal and final rounds. He helped China to win the 1982 Thomas Cup (world men's team championship) by winning three of his four matches in the last two rounds against Denmark and Indonesia. In 1983 Changjie won the Asian Championships in a grueling duel with Indonesia's Eddy Kurniawan The following year Changjie married Zhang Ailing, a brilliant player on the Chinese women's team, and neither appeared in international competition after 1984.

Achievements

World Cup 
Men's singles

World Games 
Men's singles

Asian Games 
Men's singles

Asian Championships 
Men's singles

References

External links
 

1959 births
Living people
Chinese male badminton players
Asian Games gold medalists for China
Asian Games bronze medalists for China
Asian Games medalists in badminton
Badminton players at the 1982 Asian Games
Medalists at the 1982 Asian Games
World Games medalists in badminton
World Games gold medalists
Competitors at the 1981 World Games
Badminton players from Liaoning
21st-century Chinese people
20th-century Chinese people